The 2022–23 season is Arsenal Women's Football Club's 37th season of competitive football. The club is currently participating in the Women's Super League, the FA Cup and the Champions League. They also won the League Cup for the 6th time, their first piece of silverware since winning the 2018–19 WSL.

Squad statistics 
Statistics as of 17 March 2023.

Appearances and goals

Goalscorers

Disciplinary record

Clean sheets

Transfers, loans, and other signings

Transfers in

Contract extensions

Transfers out

Loans out

Current injuries

Suspensions

Pre-season

Competitions

Women's Super League

League table

Results summary

Results by matchday

Matches

FA Cup 

As a member of the top two tiers, Arsenal entered the FA Cup in the fourth round.

League Cup 

Arsenal automatically qualified for the quarter-finals of the League Cup because of reaching the Champions League group stage.

UEFA Women's Champions League

Second qualifying round

Group stage

Play-offs

Quarter-finals

References

External links 
 

Arsenal W.F.C. seasons
Arsenal